The Independent Union of Maritime and Related Workers (SIMA) is a small, independent trade union centre of Angola.

References

External links
 www.itfglobal.org - SIMA at the ITF

Trade unions in Angola
International Transport Workers' Federation
Maritime trade unions